The Los Molinos Dam (in Spanish, Dique Los Molinos) is a dam over the course of the Los Molinos River in the center-west of the province of Córdoba, Argentina, about  above mean sea level.

The dam gathers the flow of a  catchment basin.

The dam was built between 1948 and 1953, and its primary goals are the regulation of the flow of the river and the production of hydroelectricity. The power station generates  for the Center Region of the Argentine Interconnection System.   

The reservoir is bordered by Provincial Route 5. It is employed for fishing (silverside), swimming, water skiing and sailing.

Notes

References

 CordobaGlobal.com.ar   
 Embalse Dique Los Molinos at Champaqui.com.ar.

External links

Dams completed in 1953
Energy infrastructure completed in 1956
Dams in Argentina
Geography of Córdoba Province, Argentina
Buildings and structures in Córdoba Province, Argentina
Hydroelectric power stations in Argentina
Arch dams